Chandu Lal Sahu (born 1 June 1959) is an Indian politician. He was elected to the Lok Sabha from Mahasamund as a Bharatiya Janata Party candidate in 2009 and 2014.  Previously, he had been elected as a member of the Chhattisgarh Legislative Assembly from Rajim in 2003.

References

1959 births
Living people
India MPs 2009–2014
Lok Sabha members from Chhattisgarh
India MPs 1998–1999
People from Mahasamund district
India MPs 2014–2019
Bharatiya Janata Party politicians from Chhattisgarh